Vuča is a village in the municipality of Rožaje, Montenegro. It is located at the Serbian border.

Demographics
According to the 2011 census, its population was 418.

References

Populated places in Rožaje Municipality